Quzan (also Romanized as Qūzān; also known as Ozan and Uzūn) is a village in Golabar Rural District, in the Central District of Ijrud County, Zanjan Province, Iran. At the 2006 census, its population was 520, in 134 families.

References 

Populated places in Ijrud County